Monocondylaea is a genus of bivalves belonging to the family Mycetopodidae.

Species:
 Monocondylaea corrientesensis (d'Orbigny, 1835)
 Monocondylaea costulata (Moricand, 1858)
 Monocondylaea franciscana (Moricand, 1837)
 Monocondylaea guarayana (d'Orbigny, 1835)
 Monocondylaea jaspidea (Hupé, 1857)
 Monocondylaea minuana (d'Orbigny, 1835)
 Monocondylaea paraguayana (d'Orbigny, 1835)
 Monocondylaea parchappii (d'Orbigny, 1835)

References

Bivalve genera
Unionida